"I Need Something" is a song written and performed by Newton Faulkner. It was the first single to be released from his debut album Hand Built by Robots. It reached #107 in the UK Charts in May 2007.

The song was originally released on Newton's Full Fat EP. It was available for download on 16 April 2007 and available to buy on 7 May. The B-side is a live version of Newton's SpongeBob SquarePants theme, also including a special rendition of "Junglebob". There have been two music videos released for the song.

"I Need Something" was re-released as a download only single on 31 March 2008 and was A-listed on BBC Radio 1's playlist.

"I Need Something" was released as a CD single in Australia on 20 September 2008.

Track listing
"I Need Something"
"SpongeBob SquarePants Theme"

References

2007 singles
Newton Faulkner songs
Songs written by Newton Faulkner
2007 songs